Aikaterini Deli (born 12 January 1975) is a Greek basketball player who competed in the 2004 Summer Olympics.

References

1975 births
Living people
Greek women's basketball players
Olympic basketball players of Greece
Basketball players at the 2004 Summer Olympics
Basketball players from Athens